The 1983 USFL season was the inaugural season of the United States Football League.

Rules differences from NFL
Optional 2 point conversion after touchdown (the NFL would add this rule in 1994).
Optional 1 inch kicking tee for extra points and field goal attempts.
Clock stop on first downs within the last 2 minutes of the 2nd and 4th quarters.
Intentional and unintentional pass interference.
Six member officiating crew (no side judge).
The USFL game ball was  inch (1 cm) shorter than the NFL game ball (both made by Wilson).
There were no preseason games.

Expansion cities for 1984
During the 1983 season, the USFL announced expansion cities for the 1984 season.
Pittsburgh April 28 
San Diego May 16; moved to Tulsa July 7  
Houston May 19 
Jacksonville June 14 
San Antonio July 11 
Memphis July 17

Regular season
W = Wins, L = Losses, T = Ties, PCT= Winning Percentage, PF= Points For, PA = Points Against

 = Division Champion,  = Wild Card

<div>

Michigan won  the tiebreaker with Chicago based on season series 2-0-0

Playoffs

Statistics

1983 regular season stat leaders

Awards

1983 USFL All-League Team
 WR Trumaine Johnson, CHIC
 WR Eric Truvillion, TB
 TE Raymond Chester, OAKL
 T Irv Eatman, PHIL
 T Ray Pinney, MICH
 G Buddy Aydelette, BIRM
 G Thom Dornbrook, MICH
 C Bob Van Duyne, TB
 QB Bobby Hebert, MICH
 HB Herschel Walker, NJ
 HB Kelvin Bryant, PHIL
 DE Mike Raines, BIRM
 DE Kit Lathrop, CHIC
 NT Fred Nordgren, TB
 OLB John Corker, MICH
 OLB Stan White, CHIC
 ILB Sam Mills, PHIL
 ILB Marcus Marek, BOS
 CB Jeff George, TB
 CB David Martin, DENV
 S Luther Bradley, CHIC
 S Scott Woerner, PHIL
 K Tim Mazzetti, BOS
 KR Eric Robinson, WASH
 P Stan Talley, OAKL
 PR David Martin, DENV

1983 The Sporting News USFL All-Star Team
 WR Trumaine Johnson, CHIC
 WR Eric Truvillion, TB
 TE Raymond Chester, OAKL
 T Irv Eatman PHIL
 T Ray Pinney MICH
 G Buddy Aydelette, BIRM
 G Tyrone McGriff, MICH
 C Bart Oates, PHIL
 QB Bobby Hebert, MICH
 HB Herschel Walker, NJ
 HB Kelvin Bryant, PHIL
 DE Mike Raines, BIRM
 DE Calvin Turner, DENV
 NT Kit Lathrop, CHIC
 DT Eddie Weaver, LA
 OLB John Corker, MICH
 OLB Ben Needham, BOS
 ILB Sam Mills, PHIL
 ILB Ray Bentley, MICH
 CB Clarence Chapman, MICH
 CB David Martin, DENV
 S David Greenwood, MICH
 S Scott Woerner, PHIL
 K Tim Mazzetti, BOS
 KR Eric Robinson, WASH
 P Sean Landeta, PHIL
 PR Anthony Carter, MICH

Season awards

See also
 1983 NFL season

United States Football League
1983